Brett I. Moritz (born July 15, 1955) is a former American football guard. He played for the Tampa Bay Buccaneers in 1978.

References

1955 births
Living people
American football offensive guards
Army Black Knights football players
Nebraska Cornhuskers football players
Tampa Bay Buccaneers players